Ivan Siriščević (born 30 April 1987) is a Croatian professional basketball player currently playing for BC Vienna of the Austrian Basketball Superliga.

External links
 Profile at aba-liga.com
 Profile at eurobasket.com

1987 births
Living people
ABA League players
Croatian expatriate sportspeople in Romania 
Croatian men's basketball players
CSU Pitești players
GKK Šibenik players
HKK Široki players
Kecskeméti TE (basketball) players
KK Cibona players
KK Split players
Mitteldeutscher BC players
SCM U Craiova (basketball) players
Shooting guards
Small forwards
Basketball players from Split, Croatia
KK Zadar players